Nina Povey (born 27 August 1994) is a British figure skater. She has won four senior international medals, including gold at the 2022 Britannia Cup, and is a three-time British national bronze medalist.

Career 
Povey began learning to skate in 2003. She trained in Solihull before relocating to Sheffield.

Povey made her senior international debut at the Bavarian Open in February 2015. The 2016 CS Ondrej Nepela Memorial was her first ISU Challenger Series event. She placed fourth at the 2017 CS Warsaw Cup.

Her first senior international medal, bronze, came at the Mentor Toruń Cup in February 2018.

In February 2022, Povey was one of the featured skaters in BBC Three's Freeze: Skating on the Edge. She won gold at the Britannia Cup in August and silver at Skate Celje in November. In January, she took bronze at the 2023 EduSport Trophy in Romania.

Programs

Competitive highlights 
CS: Challenger Series

References

External links 
 
 

1994 births
English female single skaters
Living people
Sportspeople from Nottingham